The 2018–19 2. Frauen-Bundesliga was the 15th season of Germany's second-tier women's football league, and the first as a single-division league. The season began on 18 August 2018 and concluded on 19 May 2019. The champions and runners-up were promoted to the Frauen-Bundesliga, while the three bottom teams were relegated to the Frauen-Regionalliga.

1. FC Köln and USV Jena gained promotion to the Bundesliga while Hessen Wetzlar, SV Weinberg and SGS Essen II were relegated to the Regionalliga.

Teams

Team changes

Stadiums

League table

Results

Top scorers

References

External links

2018-19
2018–19 in German women's football leagues